The Veteran Health Identification Card (VHIC) is an identification card issued by the United States Department of Veterans Affairs (VA) for eligible veterans to receive medical care at VA Medical Facilities. The VHIC protects the privacy of veterans' sensitive information, as it no longer displays the Social Security number or date of birth on the front of the card. The VHIC will only display the veteran's name, picture, and special eligibility indicators—Service Connected, Purple Heart and former POW, if applicable, on the front of the card. Only veterans who are eligible for VA medical benefits will receive the card. Starting on Jan. 1, 2020, the Purple Heart and Disabled Veterans Equal Access Act allows Purple Heart recipients, former prisoners of war and veterans with service-connected disabilities entry onto military installations to use the AAFES Exchange; commissary and Morale, Welfare and Recreation facilities.

Pre-identified primary caregivers of veterans with service-connected disabilities, as documented by the Department of Veterans Affairs, will also be granted entry onto the installation and access to these facilities.

To access the base, these veterans will need to show a Department of Veterans Affairs’ Veterans Health Identification Card, or VHIC. Information on how to obtain this card is available on the VA's Web site at: www.va.gov/health-care/get-health-id-card.

Background

Purpose

The only purpose of the card is for identification and check-in for VA appointments at VA Medical Centers (VAMC), Outpatient Clinics (OPC) and Community Based Outpatient Clinics (CBOC). The VHIC cannot be used as a credit card or an insurance card, and it does not authorize or pay for care at non-VA facilities.

Veterans Health Identification Card
In 2014 the Veterans Administration established a newly designed Veterans Health Identification Card (VHIC) to replace the legacy Veterans Identification Card (VIC). The new Veterans Health Identification Card comes with additional security features and a different look and feel, replaced the old Veteran Identification Card, first issued in 2004. The new cards will protect against identity theft and will be personalized with the emblem of the veteran's branch of service. Other new features add "VA" in braille, to help visually impaired veterans, along with VA phone numbers and emergency-care instructions.

Qualification

Minimum duty requirements

Most veterans who enlisted after September 7, 1980, or entered active duty after October 16, 1981, must have served 24 continuous months or the full period for which they were called to active duty in order to be eligible. This minimum duty requirement may not apply to veterans who were discharged for a disability incurred or aggravated in the line of duty, for a hardship or "early out", or those who served prior to September 7, 1980. Since there are a number of other exceptions to the minimum duty requirements, VA encourages all veterans to apply so that they may determine their enrollment eligibility.

Veterans who may qualify

Veterans with a service-connected disability rating
Served in combat or in a war zone
Medical conditions incurred while in the service
Location of service
Served in theater of combat operations within the past five years
Received a Purple Heart Medal
Former Prisoner of War
Receive VA pension or disability benefits
Make less than US$62,000 annually 
Honorable, General, or Other-Than-Honorable, Clemency, Bad Conduct Discharge

Veterans who are disqualified
Dishonorable Discharge: with this characterization of service, all veterans' benefits are lost, regardless of any past honorable service

In September 2011, the Veterans ID Card Act, HR 2985, was introduced by US Congressmen Todd Akin, and Silvestre Reyes. The bill would allow the VA to issue photo identification cards to veterans who are not retirees but who also do not presently receive VA medical benefits.

State and local government veterans cards
Other jurisdictions at state, county and municipal levels have also created their own identification card schemes for easier veteran access to discounts and other benefits within the jurisdiction. In most states, including Washington, D.C. and Puerto Rico, a person's driver's license or state identification card may optionally carry a veteran status identifier.

See also
 Veterans Health Administration

Notes

References

External links 
 , US Department of Veterans Affairs: Veterans Health Administration

Healthcare in the United States
Identity documents of the United States
United States Department of Veterans Affairs